Marshall D. Brown (born March 11, 1985) is an American former professional basketball player. He played college basketball for the University of Missouri before playing professionally in England, Brazil, Japan, Australia and Ukraine, as well as in the Premier Basketball League and the NBA Development League.

High school career
Brown attended Lyndon B. Johnson High School in Austin, Texas where he played basketball under head coach Freddy Roland. As a junior in 2002–03, he averaged 24 points, seven rebounds and three assists per game.

In November 2003, Brown signed a National Letter of Intent to play college basketball for the University of Missouri.

Brown earned first-team All-State and first-team All-Region honors playing for Lyndon B. Johnson as a junior and senior, was a three-time all-district selection, and was named the Cen-Tex Player of the Year by the Austin American-Statesman as a senior in 2003–04.

College career
As a freshman at Missouri in 2004–05, Brown scored in double figures five times, including a season-high 12 points against Texas Tech on January 19, 2005. In 33 games (six starts), he averaged 5.1 points and 1.9 rebounds in 16.8 minutes per game.

As a sophomore in 2005–06, Brown scored in double figures 14 times. He recorded his first career double-double with 19 points and a career-high 11 rebounds against Eastern Illinois on December 28, and scored a season-high 21 points on 8-for-12 shooting against Oklahoma on January 10. In 28 games (27 starts), he averaged 9.6 points, 4.8 rebounds and 1.4 assists in 27.2 minutes per game.

As a junior in 2006–07, Brown finished the year as one of three Tigers in double figures, averaging 10.1 points, 4.2 rebounds, 1.5 assists and 0.8 steals in 30 games. He recorded a career-high 28 points on 9-for-13 shooting and 8-for-8 from the free throw line against Kansas State on January 13, 2007.

Following his junior season, Brown was diagnosed with a stress fracture in his pelvis which, along with a broken foot he occurred a few months later, sidelined him for the majority of the 2007 offseason. The injuries disrupted his senior season preparation as he went into the 2007–08 season with a lesser role in coach Mike Anderson's rotation. As a senior, he averaged a career-low 4.5 points and made just three starts in 31 total games. He scored in double figures in five games, recording a season-high 14 points on 6-for-9 shooting against Texas on January 12, 2008.

College statistics

|-
| style="text-align:left;"| 2004–05
| style="text-align:left;"| Missouri
| 33 || 6 || 16.8 || .422 || .379 || .640 || 1.9 || .5 || .6 || .2 || 5.1
|-
| style="text-align:left;"| 2005–06
| style="text-align:left;"| Missouri
| 28 || 27 || 27.2 || .456 || .158 || .687 || 4.8 || 1.4 || .7 || .3 || 9.6
|-
| style="text-align:left;"| 2006–07
| style="text-align:left;"| Missouri
| 30 || 29 || 21.8 || .450 || .294 || .705 || 4.2 || 1.5 || .8 || .4 || 10.1
|-
| style="text-align:left;"| 2007–08
| style="text-align:left;"| Missouri
| 31 || 3 || 13.1 || .409 || .386 || .625 || 1.9 || .9 || .5 || .3 || 4.5
|-
| style="text-align:center;" colspan="2"|Career
| 122 || 65 || 19.5 || .439 || .313 || .678 || 3.1 || 1.1 || .6 || .3 || 7.2
|-

Professional career

2008–09 season
On November 7, 2008, Brown was selected by the Austin Toros in the ninth round of the 2008 NBA Development League Draft. However, he was later waived by the Toros on November 21, 2008 after appearing in one preseason game. In December 2008, he signed with the Sheffield Sharks for the rest of the 2008–09 BBL season. In 21 games for the Sharks, he averaged 13.3 points, 6.7 rebounds, 2.5 assists and 1.2 steals per game.

2009–10 season
On September 14, 2009, Brown signed with Palmeiras/Lupo/Araraquara of the Novo Basquete Brasil. However, in December 2009, he was released by the club due to off court issues that were not specified. Later that month, he signed with the Vermont Frost Heaves for the 2010 PBL season. He led Vermont in scoring with 16.8 points in 19 games as the team finished the season with a 12–8 record.

2010–11 season
On December 16, 2010, Brown signed with the Halifax Rainmen for the 2011 PBL season. In 22 games for Halifax, he averaged 12.3 points, 5.0 rebounds and 1.4 assists per game.

2011–12 season
On November 3, 2011, Brown joined the Rio Grande Valley Vipers of the NBA Development League, going on to make his debut for the team on November 25 in the season opener against the Erie BayHawks. In 31 minutes of action off the bench, he recorded 18 points and 8 rebounds in a 122–113 win. On December 10, 2011, he signed with the Portland Trail Blazers, but was waived a week later prior to the start of the 2011–12 NBA season. On December 20, he returned to the Vipers where he played out the season. In 41 games for the Vipers, he averaged 10.2 points, 4.7 rebounds and 1.2 assists per game.

2012–13 season
In September 2012, Brown signed with the Miyazaki Shining Suns for the 2012–13 bj league season. However, in November 2012, he left the financially troubled team after appearing in just six games, and the following month, he joined the Akita Northern Happinets for the rest of the season. In 32 games for Akita, he averaged 19.7 points, 8.3 rebounds and 3.6 assists per game.

2013–14 season
In August 2013, Brown signed with the Shiga Lakestars for the 2013–14 bj league season, returning to Japan for a second stint. On December 27, 2013, he was named to the Eastern Conference All-Star squad for the January 26 game. In 57 games for Shiga, he averaged 15.9 points, 6.7 rebounds, 2.9 assists and 1.2 steals per game.

2014–15 season
On March 11, 2015, Brown signed with the Perth Redbacks for the 2015 State Basketball League season. In his second game for the team on March 20, he scored 48 points against the Lakeside Lightning. He was subsequently named Player of the Week for round two. He left the team in June 2015. In 15 games, he averaged 18.2 points, 6.6 rebounds and 2.3 assists per game.

2015–16 season
In August 2015, Brown signed with Kanazawa Samuraiz for the 2015–16 bj league season, returning to Japan for a third stint. On November 14, he scored a then season-high 29 points in a 75–72 win over Bambitious Nara. On January 17, 2016, he recorded a season-high 32 points and 11 rebounds in an 84–68 win over Rizing Fukuoka. On March 13, he had a 28-point game in a 92–52 win over Hamamatsu. In 51 games for Kanazawa, Brown averaged 13.4 points, 6.9 rebounds, 2.8 assists and 1.1 steals per game.

2016–17 season
In September 2016, Brown signed with BC Budivelnyk of the Ukrainian Basketball SuperLeague. He left the team in October after averaging 3.2 points and 3.0 rebounds in five games.

Career statistics

Regular season 

|-
| align="left" rowspan=2| 2012–13
| align="left" | Miyazaki
| 6 || || 28.5 || .414 || .367 || .609 || 5.8 || 2.2 || .8 || .3 || 16.2
|-
| align="left" | Akita
| 34 || 27 || 33.0 || .439 || .343 || .654 || 7.6 || 3.3 || .9 || .4 || 19.5
|-
| align="left" | 2013–14
| align="left" | Shiga
| 52 || 52 || 31.7 || .419 || .375 || .665 || 6.9 || 3.1 || 1.2 || .6 || 16.2
|-
| align="left" | 2015–16
| align="left" | Kanazawa
| 50 || 45 || 27.7 || .456 || .325 || .615 || 6.9 || 2.7 || 1.1 || .4 || 13.4
|- class="sortbottom"
! style="text-align:center;" colspan=2| Japan totals 
! 142 || || 30.4 || .436 || .355 || .646 || 7.0 || 2.9 || 1.1 || .5 || 16.0
|-

Personal
Brown has five siblings (two brothers and three sisters), and lists his grandfather and Michael Jordan as people he looked up to growing up.

References

External links
Missouri bio
NBA D-League profile

1985 births
Living people
Akita Northern Happinets players
American expatriate basketball people in Australia
American expatriate basketball people in Brazil
American expatriate basketball people in Japan
American expatriate basketball people in the United Kingdom
American expatriate basketball people in Ukraine
American men's basketball players
Basketball players from Austin, Texas
BC Budivelnyk players
Halifax Rainmen players
Kanazawa Samuraiz players
Missouri Tigers men's basketball players
Miyazaki Shining Suns players
Novo Basquete Brasil players
Rio Grande Valley Vipers players
Sheffield Sharks players
Shiga Lakes players
Small forwards